Theodoxus pallasi is a species of a freshwater snail with an operculum, an aquatic gastropod mollusk in the family Neritidae, the nerites.

Description
Coloration, radula and operculum of Theodoxus pallasi is similar to Theodoxus schultzii.

Distribution
The distribution of is Ponto-Caspian.

This species occurs in:
 Caspian Sea
 Armenia
 Kazakhstan
 South Russia
 Uzbekistan
 It was recorded from Kerman Province and Mazandaran Province in Iran (as Theodoxus lituratus).

Predators
Predators of Theodoxus pallasi include:

 dunlin Calidris alpina

References

Neritidae
Taxa named by Wassili Adolfovitch Lindholm
Gastropods described in 1924